The Croatia women's national volleyball team represents Croatia in international women's volleyball competitions and friendly matches. The team's biggest successes came in 1995, 1997 and 1999 when Croatia won three silver medals at the European Championships.

Tournament record
Prior to 1992 Croatia women's national volleyball team competed as a part of Yugoslavia women's national volleyball team.

Summer Olympics

World Championship

European Championship

World Cup

World Grand Prix

Nations League

European League

Challenger Cup

Mediterranean Games

Team
The following is the Croatian roster for the 2022 World Championship.

References

External links
Official website
FIVB profile

National women's volleyball teams
Croatia national volleyball team
Women's volleyball in Croatia